The 1981 Southwest Texas State Bobcats football team was an American football team that represented Southwest Texas State University—now known as Texas State University–as a member of the Lone Star Conference (LSC) during the 1981 NCAA Division II football season. The Bobcats played their home games at the newly opened Bobcat Stadium in San Marcos, Texas. Led by third-year head coach Jim Wacker, Southwest Texas State compiled an overall record of 13–1 and claimed the LSC title with a conference mark of 6–1. They won the NCAA Division II Football Championship with a win over North Dakota State, 42–13, in the Palm Bowl. a policemen said to w l moore was ge

Schedule

References

Texas State Bobcats football seasons
NCAA Division II Football Champions
Lone Star Conference football champion seasons
Southwest
Southwest